Night Lights is the third major label album by singer-songwriter Elliott Murphy produced by Steve Katz and recorded at Electric Lady Studio. It was reviewed by Dave Marsh in Rolling Stone, where he wrote "In 1973 and 1974 it seemed to many of us in New York that it was a tossup whether Bruce Springsteen, the native poet of the mean streets, or Elliott Murphy, the slumming suburbanite with the ironic eye would became a national hero." The album featured guest appearances by fellow Long Island native Billy Joel and former Velvet Underground member Doug Yule. The cover photo of Murphy standing in Times Square early one Sunday Morning was taken by photographer Michael Dakota although stylised by Steven Meisel. The song "Lady Stilletto" was thought to be an homage to Patti Smith.

Track listing
All tracks composed by Elliott Murphy

"Diamonds by the Yard"
"Deco Dance"
"Rich Girls"
"Abraham Lincoln Continental"
"Isadora's Dancers"
"You Never Know What You're In For"
"Lady Stilletto"
"Lookin' For a Hero"
"Never As Old As You"

Personnel
Elliott Murphy – vocals, acoustic and electric guitar, harmonica, keyboards
Billy Joel – piano on "Deco Dance"
Mike Braun – drums, percussion
Andy Paley - drums, percussion
Michael Brecker, Howard Johnson, Lou Marini, Lew Soloff, Tom Malone - horns on "Deco Dance"
Ernie Brooks – bass
Richard Davis – double bass
Jerry Harrison – organ, piano, ARP string synthesizer
Steve Katz – backing vocals on "Lookin' For a Hero"
Ralph Schuckett – organ, piano, clavichord, horn and violin arrangement
Doug Yule – guitar, backing vocals
Mark Horowitz - pedal steel guitar on "Never As Old As You"
Harry Lookofsky – violin on "Deco Dance"
Technical
Dave Wittman - engineer
Acy Lehman - art direction
Dennis Katz - cover concept
Michael Dakota - photography

References

1975 albums
Elliott Murphy albums
RCA Records albums
albums recorded at Electric Lady Studios